The 1937–38 Kansas Jayhawks men's basketball team represented the University of Kansas during the 1937–38 college men's basketball season.

Roster
Lyman Corlis
Fenlon Durand
Donald Ebling
Loren Florell
George Golay
Richard Harp
Robert Hunt
Carl Johnson
Lester Kappelman
Charles Nees
Kirk Owen
Fred Pralle
Bruce Reid
Sylvester Schmidt
Nelson Sullivan
Edwin Wienecke

Schedule

References

Kansas Jayhawks men's basketball seasons
Kansas
Kansas
Kansas